Jacques Maire (born 4 April 1962) is a French politician serving as the member of the National Assembly for the 8th constituency of Hauts-de-Seine since 2017. He is a member of La République En Marche! (LREM).

Career
In Parliament, Maire serves as deputy chairman of the Committee on Foreign Affairs. He is also a member of the Franco-Japanese Friendship Group and the Franco-Australian Friendship Group.

In addition to his committee assignments, Maire has been a member of the French delegation to the Parliamentary Assembly of the Council of Europe since 2017. In this capacity, he serves on the Committee on Political Affairs and Democracy and as the Assembly's rapporteur on Algeria (2019) and the poisoning of Alexei Navalny (2020).

In September 2018, after François de Rugy's appointment to the government, Maire supported Barbara Pompili's candidacy for the presidency of the National Assembly. Since 2020, he has been serving as his parliamentary group's co-rapporteur on the government's pension reform plans, alongside Guillaume Gouffier-Cha, Carole Grandjean and Corinne Vignon. He co-founded a new political party alongside Pompili; En Commun in 2020.

In April 2021, Maire was included in a list of eight public officials that were banned by Russia's Ministry of Foreign Affairs from entering the country in retaliation for EU sanctions on Russians.

Political positions
In 2019, Maire voted in favour of the French ratification of the European Union's Comprehensive Economic and Trade Agreement (CETA) with Canada. In 2020, Maire co-authored (along with Michèle Tabarot) a parliamentary report recommending tighter parliamentary oversight of government decisions on arms exports.

See also
 2017 French legislative election

References

1962 births
Living people
People from Enghien-les-Bains
Deputies of the 15th National Assembly of the French Fifth Republic
La République En Marche! politicians
Socialist Party (France) politicians
Paris Dauphine University alumni
Sciences Po alumni
École nationale d'administration alumni
Politicians from Île-de-France
French political party founders
Members of Parliament for Hauts-de-Seine